Gustavo Magariños Morales de los Rios (31 December 1922 – 17 January 2014) was a Uruguayan basketball player. He competed in the men's tournament at the 1948 Summer Olympics.

References

External links

1922 births
2014 deaths
Uruguayan men's basketball players
Olympic basketball players of Uruguay
Basketball players at the 1948 Summer Olympics
Sportspeople from Montevideo